Jevstatije II (1292–d. 1309) was the Archbishop of Serbs from 1292 to 1309. In the times of his two predecessors, Serbia expanded significantly in territory. In 1282, Skoplje (future capital), Polog, Ovče Polje, Zletovo, Pijenac, Kičevo and Debar were conquered. In the north Braničevo and Vidin were taken by 1290. New eparchies were established: Gračanička, Končanska, Limska, Mačvanska, Braničevska, Beogradska and Skopska. The Serbian Orthodox Church venerates him as Saint Jevstatije II on August 16 (August 29, Gregorian calendar).

Sources
Pakitibija.com, Житије срба светитеља (Lives of the Serbian saints): Свети Јевстатије Други, светитељ - архиепископ (Saint Eustathius Second, saint - archbishop)]

13th-century Serbian people
13th-century Christian saints
13th-century Eastern Orthodox bishops
14th-century Serbian people
14th-century Christian saints
14th-century Eastern Orthodox bishops
Serbian saints of the Eastern Orthodox Church
Archbishops of Serbs
Eastern Orthodox Christians from Serbia
Year of birth missing
1309 deaths